Kaštel   (It. Castelvenere or Castelvenere di Pirano) is a village in Istria, Croatia, located on the border with Slovenia. It is connected by the D21 highway.

Populated places in Istria County